Turiwára or Turiuara are an indigenous people of Brazil, living in the states of Pará and Amazonas. In 1995, their population was 30. Their language, Turiwára, which belongs to subgroup VIII of the Tupi-Guarani languages, is extinct.

References

External links
Turwára artwork, National Museum of the American Indian

Indigenous peoples of the Amazon
Indigenous peoples in Brazil